Hugh Donaldson O'Bryant (1813–1883) was the first mayor of Portland, Oregon, United States, serving from 1851–1852. He later served as the President of the Oregon Territory’ Council chamber of the legislature, and was a member of Washington Territory’s legislature.

Early life
Hugh O’Bryant was born in 1813 in Franklin County, Georgia, to a missionary father. There he was raised among the Cherokee Indians due to his father’s missionary work. Hugh later moved to Arkansas where in early 1843 he set out for the Oregon Country. He arrived at Oregon City, Oregon, in October 1843 and set up shop as a merchant.

Oregon
After two years in Oregon City O’Bryant moved across the Willamette River to Portland, Oregon, where he remained until 1852. In 1847, he volunteered to fight in the Cayuse War after the Whitman massacre. During 1848 he served in Second Company of the Oregon Riflemen for the Provisional Government of Oregon as a first lieutenant.

In 1851, he won Portland's first mayoral election by a mere four votes over challenger Joseph Showalter Smith, O'Bryant's one-year reign was known for the failure of Portland's first government to effectively govern the city, leading to a new city charter in 1852.

In O'Bryant's only year as mayor, he missed seven out of thirty-one council meetings. Although the council passed resolutions to build roads, build a jail, and purchase a fire engine, none of these materialized under O'Bryant's leadership. Funds for the fire engine were authorized by citywide vote on May 26, 1851, but it was only a week before his term ended, the following March, that O'Bryant notified the council that the bills authorizing this purchase were sitting on his desk, unsigned. Later he performed justice of the peace duties, and was a gold prospector. However, perhaps his greatest assets in Portland were his carpentry skills, which were in great demand with new immigrants flooding Portland.

In 1852, he moved to Salem, then to Roseburg, where he married his wife, Matilda, and had seven children. While in Southern Oregon O'Bryant served in the Oregon Territory’s legislature beginning in 1855. The following session he returned, again serving as a Democrat representing Douglas, Coos, Umpqua, and Curry counties in the upper chamber Council. Then in 1857 he became the President of that chamber. Lastly in 1858 he was a member of Oregon's last Territorial Legislature as Oregon awaited statehood.

Later years
In 1860, O'Bryant moved on to Walla Walla, of the Washington Territory, where he served in the territorial legislature. Later he moved to Merced County, California, where he died in 1883. O'Bryant Square in Portland is named after O'Bryant.

See also 
 List of mayors of Portland, Oregon

Footnotes

References

 

1813 births
1883 deaths
Mayors of Portland, Oregon
Members of the Oregon Territorial Legislature
Members of the Washington Territorial Legislature
People from Franklin County, Georgia
Politicians from Walla Walla, Washington
Oregon Democrats
Washington (state) Democrats
19th-century American politicians